Cycas brunnea is a species of cycad in the genus Cycas, native to northern Australia in northwest Queensland and northeast Northern Territory in a small area straddling the border of the two regions. It occurs on exposed sites in savanna and creek valleys on sandstone and limestone derived soils, with moderate seasonal rainfall.

The stems grow to 2–5 m tall, with numerous leaves in the crown. The leaves are 1.2-1.7 m long, glabrous with age, pinnate, with 160-240 leaflets, the leaflets 17–27 cm long and 6–7.5 mm wide. The petioles are covered in brown tomentum and armed with sharp spines.

The female cones are open, with sporophylls 28–32 cm long. Orange tomentose covering cone, with serrations along margins of the lamina. The sarcotesta is orange and glaucous, the sclerotesta ovoid and flattened. The male cones are solitary and long ovoid, 21 cm long and 13 cm diameter, brown tomentose, and with an upturned apical spine.

It was first described in 1992, and is similar in appearance to Cycas angulata. It is considered near-threatened due to its restricted range, though it occurs in some protected areas including Boodjamulla National Park. It is named after the Greek word brunneus (brown), as the emergent leaves are brown tomentose.

References
Cycad Pages: Cycas brunnea
IUCN Redlist: Cycas brunnea

brunnea
Flora of the Northern Territory
Flora of Queensland
Cycadophyta of Australia
Endemic flora of Australia
Near threatened flora of Australia
Near threatened biota of Queensland
Nature Conservation Act rare biota
Rare flora of Australia